Sheeptown is a small village and townland in County Down, Northern Ireland. It lies to the northeast of Newry, on the old road between Newry and Rathfriland. Historically, the townland (or part of it) was called Athcruthain. In the 2001 Census it had a population of 204 people. It is part of the Newry and Mourne District Council area.

References

See also 
List of towns and villages in Northern Ireland

Villages in County Down
Townlands of County Down
Civil parish of Newry